First Blood (also known as Rambo: First Blood) is a 1982 American action film directed by Ted Kotcheff and co-written by and starring Sylvester Stallone as Vietnam War veteran John Rambo. It co-stars Richard Crenna as Rambo's mentor Sam Trautman and Brian Dennehy as Sheriff Will Teasle. It is the first installment in the Rambo franchise, followed by Rambo: First Blood Part II.

The film is based on the 1972 novel First Blood by David Morrell, which many directors and studios had unsuccessfully attempted to adapt in the 1970s. In the film, Rambo is a troubled and misunderstood Vietnam veteran who must rely on his combat and survival skills when a series of brutal events results in him having to survive a massive manhunt by police and government troops near the fictional small town of Hope, Washington.

First Blood was released in the United States on October 22, 1982. Initial reviews were mixed, but the film was a box office success, grossing $156 million and becoming the 13th highest grossing film at the domestic box office and the seventh highest grossing film worldwide. In 1985, it also became the first Hollywood blockbuster to be released in China, holding the record for the largest number of tickets sold for an American film until 2018. Since its release, it has been reappraised by critics, with many highlighting the roles of Stallone, Dennehy and Crenna, and recognizing it as an influential film in the action genre.

Its success spawned a franchise, consisting of four sequels (co-written by and starring Stallone), an animated television series, a comic books series, a novel series and several video games.

Plot 

John Rambo, a Vietnam War veteran, goes to a lake house in search of an old comrade, only to learn from his wife that his friend died of cancer, brought on by exposure to Agent Orange during the war. He apologizes for her loss and gives her a photo of the pair and the rest of their unit, Baker Team.

Continuing his travels, Rambo reaches the town of Hope, Washington. The sheriff, Will Teasle, heads him off and drives him to the outskirts of town, explaining that he considers it his job to keep drifters out of Hope. Neglecting the sheriff's warning, Rambo tries to return to Hope. Enraged, Teasle arrests Rambo on charges of vagrancy, resisting arrest, and possessing a concealed knife. Led by the sadistic chief deputy Art Galt, Teasle's officers abuse Rambo, triggering flashbacks of the torture he endured in Vietnam. When they try to dry shave him with a straight razor, Rambo snaps. He fights his way out of the station, regains his knife, steals a motorcycle and flees into the woods. Teasle organizes a search party with automatic weapons, dogs, and a helicopter.

Defying Teasle's orders, Galt attempts to shoot Rambo from the helicopter. Cornered on a high cliff, Rambo leaps into a tree, injuring his right arm. With Galt still shooting at him, Rambo throws a rock at the helicopter, breaking its windshield and causing the pilot to briefly lose control. Losing his balance, Galt falls to his death on the jagged rocks below. Rambo tries to surrender to Teasle, saying that Galt's death was an accident and that he wants no more trouble, but the officers shoot at him, and he flees. Teasle swears revenge.

With guerrilla tactics, Rambo non-lethally subdues all the deputies, using booby traps and his bare hands. Rambo holds a knife to Teasle's throat. He threatens war if Teasle does not give up the pursuit, before retreating further into the woods. The Washington State Patrol and Washington National Guard are brought in to assist Teasle, along with Rambo's mentor and former commanding officer, Colonel Sam Trautman.

Trautman advises that Rambo should be allowed to escape to the next town in order to defuse the situation, then be permitted to surrender peacefully later. Confident that Rambo is hopelessly outnumbered, Teasle refuses. He allows Trautman to contact Rambo and try to persuade him to give himself up. Rambo recognizes Trautman but refuses to come in, condemning Teasle and his deputies for their abuse.

At the entrance of an abandoned mine, a National Guard detachment corners Rambo. Ignoring Teasle's instructions to wait for his arrival, the guardsmen fire a rocket launcher, collapsing the entrance and seemingly killing Rambo. Teasle berates the soldiers for their disobedience, and demands that their superior, Clinton Morgan, dig Rambo’s body out. Rambo goes deeper into the rat infested mine. He finds a way out, hijacks an Army supply truck carrying an M60 machine gun and ammunition, and returns to town to cause as much damage as possible.

In an effort to distract the officers, Rambo blows up a gas station, shoots out most of the town's power, and destroys a sporting goods store close to the police station. Trautman, understanding that the sheriff is outmatched, tries again to convince Teasle to leave Rambo be. The sheriff ignores his orders and attempts to locate and kill Rambo. Rambo spots Teasle on the police station's roof, and shoots him. Teasle falls through a skylight.

As Rambo prepares to kill him, Trautman appears and warns Rambo that he will be killed unless he surrenders, reminding him that he is the last survivor of his elite unit of Green Berets. Rambo vents about the horrors of war and his traumatic experiences: watching his friends die in Vietnam, being unable to hold a job due to his PTSD, the nasty treatment he received from his fellow Americans when he came home, and being forgotten by the country that he sacrificed so much for. He breaks down crying as he recounts how one comrade was killed by a Vietcong child soldier using a shoeshine box wired with explosives. After being comforted by Trautman, Rambo surrenders and is taken into federal custody, while Teasle is taken to a waiting ambulance for transport to the hospital.

Cast 

 Sylvester Stallone as John J. Rambo 
 Richard Crenna as Colonel Samuel R. "Sam" Trautman
 Brian Dennehy as Sheriff William "Will" Teasle
 Bill McKinney as Captain Dave Kern
 Jack Starrett as Deputy Sergeant Arthur "Art" Galt
 Michael Talbott as Deputy Balford
 Chris Mulkey as Deputy Ward
 John McLiam as Orval Kellerman
 Alf Humphreys as Deputy Lester
 David Caruso as Deputy Mitch Rogers
 David L. Crowley as Deputy Shingleton
 Don MacKay as Deputy Preston
 Patrick Stack as Lieutenant Clinton Morgen

Production

Development 

In 1972, Lawrence Turman at Columbia Pictures bought the film rights to First Blood for $175,000. Richard Brooks was slated to direct, and intended to have the film be an allegory on differing American perceptions of World War II and Vietnam War veterans, with Sheriff Teasle portrayed more sympathetically than in the novel. The film would have ended with Teasle ordering his men to drop their guns to try to reason with Rambo, who would have then been fatally shot by an unknown assailant. Brooks planned to start shooting First Blood in New Mexico in December 1972. The film did not proceed because the Vietnam War was still underway and Brooks left the project.

Afterward, John Calley purchased the rights at Warner Bros. Pictures for $125,000 with the thought of casting either Robert De Niro or Clint Eastwood as Rambo. A screenplay was written by Walter Newman with Martin Ritt intended to direct. The film would have criticized American military culture and portrayed Colonel Trautman as the film's villain, ending with both Rambo and Teasle dying. Sydney Pollack and Martin Bregman also considered directing the film, with Bregman hiring David Rabe to write a script. After Bregman departed Mike Nichols considered directing Rabe's script.

William Sackheim and Michael Kozoll wrote the screenplay that would be the basis of the final film in 1977, originally intending for John Badham to direct. Producer Carter DeHaven purchased Sackheim and Kozoll's script from Warner Bros. for $375,000. DeHaven secured the Cinema Group as a financer and hired John Frankenheimer as director with production to begin in Georgia. This was also the first version of the script in which Rambo survived the film. However, the project stalled again after the distributor Filmways was acquired by Orion Pictures.

After Mario Kassar and Andrew G. Vajna of Anabasis Investments read the book, they got interested in doing an adaptation as the first production of their studio Carolco Pictures funded by "in-house sources". They purchased the film rights from Warner Bros. for $375,000 and Sackheim and Kozoll's script for $125,000 in 1981. Ted Kotcheff, who had been involved in the project in 1976, returned after Kassar and Vajna offered to finance one of his projects. Kotcheff offered the role of John Rambo to Sylvester Stallone, and the actor accepted after reading the script through in a weekend.

Various scripts adapted from Morrell's book had been pitched to studios in the years since its publication, but only Stallone's involvement prompted its production. The time since the end of the Vietnam War and Stallone's star power after the success of the Rocky films enabled him to rewrite the script to make the character of John Rambo more sympathetic. Morrell's book has Rambo kill many of his pursuers, and Kozoll and Sackheim's draft had him killing sixteen people, but in the movie Rambo does not directly cause the death of any police or national guardsmen. Stallone also decided to let Rambo survive the film, unlike in the book. A suicide scene was filmed but Kotcheff and Stallone opted to have Rambo turn himself in at Trautman's urging. Stallone did an estimated seven revisions of the script. Kotcheff requested further work be done on the script, which was performed by Larry Gross and David Giler.

Casting 
Brooks originally wanted to cast Bette Davis as a psychiatrist and either Burt Lancaster or Lee Marvin as Sherriff Teasle. When the project was purchased by Warner Bros., Robert De Niro and Clint Eastwood were each considered for the role of Rambo. Ritt intended to cast Robert Mitchum as Teasle and Paul Newman as Rambo. Pollack considered Steve McQueen but then rejected him because they considered him too old to play a Vietnam veteran from 1975. James Caan, Burt Reynolds and Robert Redford were also considered.

Rabe developed his screenplay with Al Pacino in mind for the role and had several conversations with the actor, who wanted to portray Rambo as a force of nature after seeing the film Jaws. However, Pacino decided not to be involved because he found the story too dark. When Badham was considered as director he wanted to cast John Travolta as Rambo, George C. Scott as Trautman, and either Gene Hackman or Charles Durning as Teasle. Frankenheimer considered Powers Boothe, Michael Douglas, and Nick Nolte as Rambo before casting Brad Davis because of his role in Midnight Express. Dustin Hoffman was offered the role of Rambo but turned it down.

For the role of Sheriff Teasle, Kassar and Vajna approached Academy Award winners Hackman and Robert Duvall but both turned the part down. Marvin, another Oscar winner, turned down the part of Colonel Trautman. James Mason and Richard Jaeckel were also considered. Kirk Douglas was eventually hired, but just before shooting began, Douglas quit the role of Colonel Trautman over a script dispute; Douglas wanted to retain the novel's original ending of Rambo and Teasle fatally wounding each other, Trautman finishing Rambo with a kill shot, then sitting with the dying Teasle for the sheriff's final moments. Douglas also wanted Trautman to have more screentime. Rock Hudson was approached as a replacement but was soon to undergo heart surgery and had to pass up the chance to work with Stallone. Richard Crenna was quickly hired as a replacement; the role of Trautman became the veteran character actor's most famous role, a performance for which he received much critical praise.

Filming 
The film was shot in the Fraser Valley of British Columbia, Canada on a $15 million budget beginning on November 15, 1981, and continuing until April 1982. The town scenes in the movie were shot in Hope and the nearby Coquihalla Canyon Provincial Park, called Chapman Gorge in the film, while the rest of the movie was shot in Capilano Canyon, Golden Ears Provincial Park and Pitt Lake in Pitt Meadows. During the production Buzz Feitshans replaced producer Ed Carlin, who suffered a heart attack.

The locations chosen for the film initially experienced unseasonably warm and sunny weather during the filming, which posed challenges since the crew had counted on an overcast setting. However, a period of heavy snowfall beginning in January 1982 delayed the production by two months. Other delays were caused by injuries to the cast during stunts, including Stallone sustaining a serious back injury and several broken ribs, in particular, due to performing his own stunt of dropping off a cliff and into a tree. Since the production ran over schedule, Crenna's role in the film was cut in order to avoid having to pay him higher fees as specified in his contract.

The firearms used in the film had to be imported into Canada because of the country's firearms regulation. In January 1982 over $50,000 worth of firearms—including fourteen M16 rifles, three Remington shotguns, two .44 Magnum revolvers, and eleven Colt AR-15 rifles—were stolen from the set. Although the guns had been modified to shoot blanks, the Royal Canadian Mounted Police claimed that they could be easily modified to fire live ammunition. After the incident the set was guarded by the Canadian Army, whose soldiers also served as extras in the film.

Post-production 
The first rough cut of the film was between 3 and 3.5 hours long. According to Sylvester Stallone, it was so bad that it sickened his agent and him. Stallone wanted to buy the movie and destroy it thinking that it was a career killer. After heavy re-editing, the film was cut down to 93 minutes; this version was ultimately released in theaters. The ending used in the finished film was shot in March 1982, after the original one was deemed unsatisfactory.

Kassar and Vajna sought either Warner Bros. 20th Century Fox, or Paramount Pictures as a distributor, displaying an 18-minute promotional reel to studios. Although they secured international distributors, they were unable to locate a domestic distributor to the film until they sent a longer 55-minute reel to the American Film Market. After Warner Bros. and Paramount expressed interest, Orion Pictures agreed to the domestic distribution of the film.

Music 

The film's score was composed and conducted by Jerry Goldsmith, whose theme "It's a Long Road" added a new dimension to the character, and featured in the film's three sequels and animated spin-off. The soundtrack was originally released on LP by the Regency label, although it was edited out of sequence for a more satisfying listen. The album was reissued on CD with one extra track ("No Power") twice, first as one of Intrada Records's initial titles, then as an identical release by Varèse Sarabande. The complete score was released by Intrada in a 2-CD set, along with a remastered version of the original album (with the Carolco logo [previously released on La-La Land Records's Extreme Prejudice album] and the Rambo: First Blood Part II trailer music added), on November 23, 2010, as one of their MAF unlimited titles.

 CD 1 – Complete Original Soundtrack
 "Theme from First Blood" (pop orchestra version)
 "Home Coming"
 "My Town"
 "Under Arrest"
 "The Razor"
 "A Head Start"
 "Hanging On"
 "Over the Cliff"
 "A Stitch in Time"
 "Mountain Hunt"
 "No Truce"
 "First Blood"
 "The Tunnel"
 "Escape Route"
 "The Truck"
 "No Power/Night Attack"
 "Hide and Seek"
 "It's a Long Road" (instrumental)
 "It's a Long Road (Theme from First Blood)" (vocal: Dan Hill)

 CD 2 – Original 1982 Soundtrack Album
 "It's a Long Road (Theme from First Blood)" (vocal: Dan Hill)
 "Escape Route"
 "First Blood"
 "The Tunnel"
 "Hanging On"
 "Home Coming"
 "Mountain Hunt"
 "My Town"
 "The Razor"
 "Over the Cliff"
 "It's a Long Road" (instrumental)
 "It's a Long Road" (recording session piano/vocal demo)
 "Carolco Logo"
 "Rambo" (Special Summer 1984 trailer)

Certifications

Release

Home media 
Author Morrell recorded an audio commentary track for the First Blood Special Edition DVD released in 2002. Actor Stallone recorded an audio commentary track for the First Blood Ultimate Edition DVD released in 2004. This edition also includes a "never-before-seen" alternate ending in which Rambo commits suicide— a fate more in line with the original novel's ending— and a "humorous" ending tacked on afterwards. A brief snippet of the suicide ending appears in a flashback in the fourth movie. Lionsgate also released this version on Blu-ray. Both commentary tracks are on the Blu-ray release.

Momentum Pictures released an HD DVD version of First Blood in the United Kingdom in April 2007. Lionsgate also released First Blood as a double feature on February 13, 2007, along with 2004's The Punisher.

The film was re-released as part of a 6-disc box set, which contains all four films in the series, on May 27, 2008. However, the box set is missing the David Morrell commentary, even though the packaging clearly states it is included. In anticipation of the release, the film was shown back in theaters for one night, May 15, 2008, through Fathom Events; the alternate ending was shown after the main feature.

First Blood was released on 4K UHD Blu-ray on November 9, 2018.

Reception

Box office 
First Blood topped the U.S. box office for three weeks in a row, and its $6,642,005 opening weekend was the best October opening at the time. The film ended as a significant financial success, with a total gross of $51 million domestically, the highest-grossing film of the fall, and the 13th highest-grossing film of the year.

The film grossed $125 million worldwide, against a $15 million budget. It was notably the first major Hollywood blockbuster to be released in China, where it was released in 1985. It sold  tickets in China, the highest for a foreign Hollywood film up until 2018.

Critical response 
The film received mixed to positive reviews from critics, and three lead actors received praise for their performances. In his review, Roger Ebert wrote that he did not like the film's ending, but that it was "a very good movie, well-paced, and well-acted not only by Stallone ... but also by Crenna and Brian Dennehy." He commented, "although almost all of First Blood is implausible, because it's Stallone on the screen, we'll buy it," and rated the film three out of four stars. The New York Times film critic Janet Maslin described Rambo as a "fierce, agile, hollow-eyed hero" who is portrayed as a "tormented, misunderstood, amazingly resourceful victim of the Vietnam War, rather than as a sadist or a villain." Maslin also praised the film's story for its "energy and ingenuity." Conversely, Variety called the film "a mess" and criticized its ending for not providing a proper resolution for the main character.<ref>{{cite magazine |url=https://variety.com/1981/film/reviews/first-blood-1200425212/ |title=Review: First Blood |magazine=Variety |date=December 31, 1981 |access-date=June 25, 2013 |archive-date=October 4, 2013 |archive-url=https://web.archive.org/web/20131004230556/http://variety.com/1981/film/reviews/first-blood-1200425212/ |url-status=live }}</ref>

In 2000, BBC film critic Almar Haflidason noted that Stallone's training in survival skills and hand-to-hand combat gave the film "a raw and authentic edge that excited the audiences of the time."

Film.com and Filmsite regard First Blood as one of the best films of 1982, and in 2008 it was named the 253rd greatest film ever by Empire magazine on its 2008 list of The 500 Greatest Movies of All Time.

On review aggregator Rotten Tomatoes, the film has an 86% approval rating based on 49 reviews, with an average rating of 7.20/10. The site's critics consensus reads, "Much darker and more sensitive than the sequels it spawned, First Blood is a thrilling survival adventure that takes full advantage of Sylvester Stallone's acting skills." On Metacritic, the film has a weighted average score of 61 out of 100 based on 15 critics, indicating "generally favorable reviews".

James Berardinelli of ReelViews called the film "a tense and effective piece of filmmaking". He noted that the film's darker tone, somber subtext, and non-exploitative violence allowed the viewer to enjoy the film not only as an action/thriller but as something with a degree of intelligence and substance. On Stallone's performance, he wrote "it seems impossible to imagine anyone other than Stallone in the part, and his capabilities as an actor should not be dismissed". In the 2010 edition of his Movie Guide Leonard Maltin gave the film one-and a half stars out of four, saying that it "throws all credibility to the winds about the time [Rambo] gets off with only a bad cut after jumping from a mountain into some jagged rocks".

 Legacy First Blood received the most positive reception of the Rambo franchise. The next four sequels received mixed or average reviews.

In a 2011 article for Blade Magazine, by Mike Carter, credit is given to Morrell and the Rambo franchise for revitalizing the cutlery industry in the 1980s due to the presence of the Jimmy Lile and Gil Hibben knives used in the films. In 2003, Blade Magazine gave Morrell an industry achievement award for having helped to make it possible.

 Other media 
 Sequel 

A sequel titled Rambo: First Blood Part II, was released in 1985.

 Video game 
In 2014, Rambo: The Video Game was released, based on the first three Rambo films.

 Bollywood remake 
In May 2013, Original Entertainment confirmed to have agreed to a five-picture deal with Millennium Films to produce Bollywood remakes of First Blood, The Expendables, 16 Blocks, 88 Minutes, and Brooklyn's Finest. In early 2016, Siddharth Anand was announced as the director of the First Blood remake. The film will be co-produced by Anand, Daljit DJ Parmar, Samir Gupta, Hunt Lowry, Saurabh Gupta, and Gulzar Inder Chahal. It will follow "Rambo", the last member of an elite unit in the Indian Armed Forces, returning home only to discover a different war waiting for him, forcing him to the jungles and mountains of the Himalayas and unleash mayhem and destruction. In May 2017, Tiger Shroff was cast in the role of Rambo with principal photography set for February 2018. The film was scheduled to be released in October 2020. Shroff is expected to star in Hindi remakes of all five films in the Rambo franchise.

 Statue 
On August 14, 2020, a cedar wood statue of Rambo was unveiled in Hope, Canada, 38 years after the film's release. Mayor Peter Robb, Canadian Member of Parliament Mark Strahl, and the statue's sculptor, Ryan Villers, attended the ceremony.

 In popular culture 
 Son of Rambow, a British comedy film inspired by First Blood''

See also 
 Survival film

References

External links 

 
 
 
 

1982 action films
1982 independent films
1980s adventure drama films
1980s American films
1980s chase films
1980s English-language films
1980s vigilante films
Albums with cover art by Drew Struzan
American action thriller films
American chase films
American films about revenge
American independent films
American vigilante films
Carolco Pictures films
Films about police brutality
Films about post-traumatic stress disorder
Films about United States Army Special Forces
Films about veterans
Films based on Canadian novels
Films based on thriller novels
Films directed by Ted Kotcheff
Films produced by Buzz Feitshans
Films scored by Jerry Goldsmith
Films set in British Columbia
Films set in Canada
Films set in forests
Films set in Vancouver
Films set in Washington (state)
Films shot in British Columbia
Films shot in Canada
Films shot in Vancouver
Films shot in Washington (state)
Films with screenplays by Sylvester Stallone
Orion Pictures films
Rambo (franchise)